Kirjath Sepher (in LXX ) was a location in southern Canaan which became part of the land allocated to the tribe of Judah when the Israelites conquered Canaan, according to the Hebrew Bible (Book of Joshua,  and Book of Judges):

And Caleb said, “He who attacks Kirjath Sepher and takes it, to him I will give Achsah my daughter as wife.

According to the narrative, Othniel the son of Kenaz, the brother of Caleb, took Kirjath Sepher and so was married to Achsah.

The place is also referred to as "Kiriath-sepher" or "Cariath-Sepher", and was later known as Debir.

Kirjath Sepher is mentioned in Papyrus Anastasi I as Karetai Thoupar.

Kappa Sigma fraternity
According to the traditions of the Kappa Sigma fraternity, the fraternity evolved from an ancient order, known in some accounts as "Kirjath Sepher", said to have been founded between 1395 and 1400 at the University of Bologna.

References

Hebrew Bible places
Tribe of Judah
Canaan
Book of Joshua
Book of Judges